Poeta is a genus of moths in the family Erebidae.

Species
Poeta denotalis Walker, 1865
Poeta quadrinotata Walker, 1865

References
Natural History Museum Lepidoptera genus database

Tinoliinae
Moth genera